is a Japanese manga series written and illustrated by Matsuri. It was serialized in Media Factory's Monthly Comic Gene magazine from July 2016 to May 2019, before moving to Kadokawa Shoten's Comic Newtype website in June 2019, where it was serialized until November 2022. As of July 2022, the series' individual chapters have been collected into eleven volumes.

Media

Manga
Written and illustrated by Matsuri, the series began serialization in Media Factory's Monthly Comic Gene magazine on July 15, 2016. The series ended serialization in Monthly Comic Gene on May 15, 2019; the series resumed serialization in Kadokawa Shoten's Comic Newtype website on June 25, 2019. The series completed its serialization in Comic Newtype on November 22, 2022. As of July 2022, the series' individual chapters have been collected into eleven tankōbon volumes.

In February 2019, Yen Press announced that they licensed the series for English publication.

Volume list

Drama CD
A drama CD adaptation was released in the August 2018 issue of Monthly Comic Gene on July 14, 2018. It starred Takuma Nagatsuka, Toshiki Masuda, and Hiroki Yasumoto.

Reception
Rebecca Silverman and Faye Hopper from Anime News Network compared the story to that of Hell Girl and xxxHolic. Silverman and Hopper both praised the artwork, but felt the story failed to explain some things they thought it should have explained. Kate O'Neil from The Fandom Post liked the story and especially liked the artwork, comparing it to Pet Shop of Horrors and xxxHolic.

References

External links
  
 

Dark fantasy anime and manga
Japanese webcomics
Kadokawa Shoten manga
Media Factory manga
Seinen manga
Shōjo manga
Webcomics in print
Yen Press titles